Liquorice or licorice is the root of Glycyrrhiza glabra from which a somewhat sweet flavor can be extracted. 

Liquorice or licorice may also refer to:
 Liquorice (confectionery), confectionery flavoured with the extract of the root
 "Liquorice" (song), a 2011 track by Azealia Banks on 1999 EP
 Licorice (EP), a 2005 Snowden EP
 L.I.C.O.R.I.C.E., an episode of TV series Codename: Kids Next Door
 Licorice McKechnie (born 1945), Scottish musician
 Licorice, a fictional character by Vinson Ngo's web-comic Sugar Bits
 Licorice (gamer), handle of professional League of Legends player Eric Ritchie

Plants
 Glycyrrhiza, the genus including G. glabra
 Glycyrrhiza echinata, Chinese licorice, German liquorice, or other names
 Glycyrrhiza inflata, Chinese licorice
 Glycyrrhiza uralensis, Chinese licorice
 Polypodium glycyrrhiza, liquorice fern

See also